Mélanie de Salignac (Marennes, Charente-Maritime, 19 January 1744 –1766) was a young blind French woman whose achievements in the face of her disability were mentioned in the accounts of Diderot. She was born blind long before the invention of Braille in 1829, but taught herself to read using cut out card letters and achieved much more through her sense of touch. Diderot wrote about her achievements in his "Addition to the Letter on the Blind". She was a musician who devised a tactile version of music notation which she used to read compositions and correspond with friends. Diderot took inspiration from her extensive skillset. He took the stance that blind people should be educated based on their existing skillset, rather than their lack of sight.
Her older brother was the politician .

References

1741 births
1763 deaths
French blind people
People from Charente-Maritime
Denis Diderot